El Caracol, the Observatory, is a unique structure at pre-Columbian Maya civilization site of Chichen Itza. El Caracol, which means 'snail' in Spanish, is so named due to the spiral staircase inside the tower.

History
The structure is dated to around AD 906, the Post Classic period of Mesoamerican chronology, by the stele on the  Upper Platform.

It is suggested that the El Caracol was an ancient Mayan observatory building and provided a way for the Mayan people to observe changes in the sky due to the flattened landscape of the Yucatán with no natural markers for this function around Chichen Itza. The observers could view the sky above the vegetation on the Yucatán Peninsula without any obstruction.

Observations

Mayan astronomers knew from naked-eye observations that Venus appeared on the western and disappeared on the eastern horizons at different times in the year, and that it took 584 days to complete one cycle.

They also knew that five of these Venus cycles equaled eight solar years. Venus would therefore make an appearance at the northerly and southerly extremes at eight-year intervals.

Of 29 possible astronomical events (eclipses, equinoxes, solstices, etc.) believed to be of interest to the Mesoamerican residents of Chichén Itzá, sight lines for 20 can be found in the structure. Since a portion of the tower resting on El Caracol has been lost, it is possible that other observations will never be ascertained.

References

Bibliography

External links

University of Virginia about El Caracol

Chichen Itza